Hervé Dubuisson (born 8 August 1957) is a French former professional basketball player and coach. During his playing career, at a height of 1.97 m (6'5 ") tall, he played at the shooting guard and small forward positions. Dubuisson is the French Championship's all-time career leader in total points scored. He is also the senior French national team's all-time career leader in total points scored. 

He was nicknamed "Monsieur Record" (English: "Mr. Record"), and "Le Blanc Qui Sautait Au-dessus Des Buildings" ("The White Man Who Jumps Above Buildings"). He was inducted into the French Basketball Hall of Fame in 2004. He was given with the French Glory of Sport award in 2012.

Early life
Dubuisson was born on 8 August 1957, in Douai, France. As a youth, he competed in the high jump and javelin throw, with the French athletics club L'Étoile Oignies (Pas-de-Calais). After that, he switched sports, and began playing youth basketball.

Professional career
Dubuisson made his club debut in the European-wide third level competition, the FIBA Korać Cup, in 1973, at the age of 15, in a game against the Luxembourg League club Steesel. During his playing career, Dubuisson won two French League championships with Le Mans, in 1978 and 1979. He was named to the FIBA European Selection team in 1980, and he was named the French League French Player's MVP in 1984.

During his pro club career, Dubuisson scored at least 50 points in a single French League game, on five occasions. His career-high for most points scored in a single French League game, was 55 points scored in a game against ASPO Tours, in 1989. He ended his club playing career as the French League's all-time leader in career total points scored, with 19,013.

National team career
Dubuisson made his debut with the senior French national team in 1974, at the age of 16. As a member of the senior French national team, Dubuisson competed at the men's basketball tournament, at the 1984 Los Angeles Summer Olympics. He also represented France at the 1986 FIBA World Championship. In addition to that, he also played with France at 7 FIBA EuroBasket tournaments. 

He played at the following EuroBasket tournaments: the 1977 EuroBasket, the 1979 EuroBasket, the 1981 EuroBasket, the 1983 EuroBasket, the 1985 EuroBasket, the 1987 EuroBasket, and the 1989 EuroBasket. He retired from the senior French national team as its all-time career leader in both caps (games played) with 259, and in total points scored, with 3,916.

He also holds the senior French national team's all-time record for the most points scored in a single game. On 21 November 1985, Dubuisson scored 51 points, in a 1986 FIBA World Championship Qualification game against Greece.

Coaching career
After he retired from playing pro basketball, Dubuisson worked as a basketball coach. He was the head coach of the French clubs Montpellier (1996–1997), Antibes (1997–1999), and SLUC Nancy (1999–2001).

Personal life
Dubuisson was involved in a traffic accident on 10 May, 2001. He was hit by a motorcycle near his home. As a result of the accident, he spent several months in a coma, and had two years of intensive rehab therapy. In 2005, he married the French-Bulgarian women's basketball player Madlena Staneva.

His biography, Hervé Dubuisson, a Life in Suspension, was published in October 2015. In 2017, a movie about Dubuisson was made. It is named The White Man Who Jumps Above Buildings. His nephew, Victor Dubuisson, is a professional golfer.

References

External links
FIBA Profile
FIBA Europe Profile
Olympedia.org Profile
Basketball-Reference.com Profile
Sports-Reference.com Archive Profile
ProBallers.com Profile
French League Profile 

1957 births
Living people
1986 FIBA World Championship players
Basketball players at the 1984 Summer Olympics
BCM Gravelines players
Denain Voltaire Basket players
French basketball coaches
French men's basketball players
Le Mans Sarthe Basket players
Montpellier Paillade Basket coaches
Montpellier Paillade Basket players
Olympic basketball players of France
Olympique Antibes basketball players
Olympique Antibes coaches
Paris Racing Basket players
People from Douai
Shooting guards
SLUC Nancy Basket coaches
SLUC Nancy Basket players
Small forwards
Sportspeople from Nord (French department)
Stade Français basketball players
Mediterranean Games silver medalists for France
Mediterranean Games medalists in basketball
Competitors at the 1975 Mediterranean Games